Don Raimundo Fernández-Villaverde y García del Rivero, iure uxoris Marquess of Pozo Rubio, (20 January 1848 – 15 July 1905) was a Spanish statesman.

Born in Madrid,  Raimundo Fernandez Villaverde graduated at age 21 from the Central University of Madrid in Law Studies.   He later became Professor of this university after receiving the degree of Doctor of Philosophy.

He joined the Conservative Party and was elected to the Spanish Parliament in 1872 as representative for Caldas.  

On 31 March 1884, he was appointed civil governor of Madrid.

From 1880 to his death, he held various government ministries including Finance, Justice and Interior, became President of Parliament, and was twice Prime Minister.

He is credited with the economic reforms passed in 1899 and 1900 that stabilised the nation's economy after the loss of the last Spanish colonies in the Americas and the Pacific Ocean.

Bibliography

Francisco Comín, Pablo Martín Aceña y Miguel Martorell (2000): La Hacienda española y sus ministros. Del 98 a la Guerra Civil, Prensas Universitarias de Zaragoza, 2000, 
Miguel Martorell Linares: “Villaverde ante el Parlamento”, Hacienda Pública Española, número monográfico, 1999, pp. 73–93.

1848 births
1905 deaths
Nobility from Madrid
Economy and finance ministers of Spain
Prime Ministers of Spain
Presidents of the Congress of Deputies (Spain)
Members of the Royal Spanish Academy
Conservative Party (Spain) politicians
Justice ministers of Spain
Marquesses of Spain
Madrid city councillors
Civil governors of Madrid